Vernon Speede Broderick (born March 11, 1963) is a United States district judge of the United States District Court for the Southern District of New York.

Biography

Broderick was born in 1963, in New York City. He received his Bachelor of Arts degree in 1985 from Yale University. He received his Juris Doctor in 1988 from Harvard Law School. He began his career at the law firm of Weil, Gotshal & Manges LLP from 1988 to 1994. He served as an Assistant United States Attorney in the Southern District of New York from 1994 to 2002 and was Chief of the Violent Gangs Unit from 1999 to 2002. Broderick rejoined Weil, Gotshal & Manges LLP in 2002 as Counsel, becoming a partner in 2005, concentrating his practice on white collar crimes, regulatory investigations and business litigation. In 2003, he was appointed to the commission to Combat Police Corruption by Mayor Michael Bloomberg. In 2011, he was appointed to the New York State Commission on Public Integrity by Governor Andrew Cuomo.

Federal judicial service

On April 15, 2013, President Barack Obama nominated Broderick to serve as a United States District Judge of the United States District Court for the Southern District of New York, to the seat vacated by Judge Deborah Batts, who assumed senior status on April 13, 2012. His nomination was reported by a voice vote of the Senate Judiciary Committee on June 13, 2013. The Senate confirmed his nomination by voice vote on September 9, 2013. He received his commission on September 10, 2013.

See also 
 List of African-American federal judges
 List of African-American jurists
 List of Hispanic/Latino American jurists

References

External links

1963 births
Living people
African-American judges
Assistant United States Attorneys
Harvard Law School alumni
Hispanic and Latino American judges
Judges of the United States District Court for the Southern District of New York
New York (state) lawyers
Lawyers from New York City
United States district court judges appointed by Barack Obama
21st-century American judges
Yale College alumni